"Fame" is a song written by Michael Gore (music) and Dean Pitchford (lyrics) and released in 1980, that achieved chart success as the theme song to the Fame film and TV series. The song was performed by Irene Cara, who played the role of Coco Hernandez in the original film. It was also her debut single as a recording artist. The song won the Academy Award for Best Original Song in 1980, and the Golden Globe Award the same year. In 2004, it finished at number 51 on AFI's 100 Years...100 Songs survey of top tunes in American cinema.

History 
Irene Cara played the role of Coco Hernandez in the movie Fame and sang the vocals for the theme song. The music for the song was by Michael Gore and the lyrics were by Dean Pitchford. The song earned Cara a Grammy nomination for Best Female Pop Vocal Performance. The movie became an "overnight sensation". The song won an Oscar for best film theme song in 1981. In July 1982, it was re-released on the back of the successful TV series and topped the charts in several countries, including the Netherlands, New Zealand and the United Kingdom. The movie was adapted into a TV series, which achieved notable ratings success in the latter country, and stage show which toured Europe.

Fame theme song 
The song was later used as the theme song for the Fame television series, which aired from 1982 to 1987. For seasons 1-4, the song was performed by Erica Gimpel who plays Cara's character, Coco on the show.  For seasons 5-6, it was performed by Loretta Chandler. The song was also used in other TV shows related to Fame.

Personnel
Irene Cara – lead vocals, backing vocals
Rob Mounsey – keyboards, piano
 Leon Pendarvis – keyboards, arrangements
Kenneth Bichel – synthesizer
Neil Jason – bass guitar
Elliott Randall – guitar solo 
David Spinozza, Jeff Mironov – guitar
Yogi Horton – drums
Jimmy Maelen, Crusher Bennet – percussion
Louise Bethune, Peggie Blue, Ivonne Lewis, Ullanda McCullough, Deborah McDuffie, Vicki Sue Robinson, Ann E. Sutton, Luther Vandross – backing vocals

Charts 
"Fame" rose to number four on the Billboard Hot 100 in September 1980. It also reached number one on the Billboard dance chart for one week. The song was re-released in the United Kingdom in July 1982, where it peaked at the top of the UK Singles Chart for three weeks following the debut of the Fame TV series on the British television network BBC One the previous month, becoming Britain's third best-selling song of 1982 behind "Eye of the Tiger" by Survivor and "Come On Eileen" by Dexys Midnight Runners and the Emerald Express, the latter of which dethroned "Fame" from the top of the UK Singles Chart. It has over sold 1.07 million copies in Britain. . The song also reached number one in Flanders (Belgium), Ireland, the Netherlands and New Zealand, and number three in Australia and Sweden.

Weekly singles charts

Year-end charts

Certifications

See also 

 "Remember (Fame)" - the Japanese-language cover by pop duo Pink Lady
 List of Dutch Top 40 number-one singles of 1983
 List of million-selling singles in the United Kingdom
 List of number-one dance singles of 1980 (U.S.)
 List of UK Singles Chart number ones of the 1980s
 List of number-one singles in 1982 (New Zealand)

References 

1980 songs
1980 debut singles
Alvin and the Chipmunks songs
Best Original Song Academy Award-winning songs
Best Original Song Golden Globe winning songs
Dutch Top 40 number-one singles
Irene Cara songs
Irish Singles Chart number-one singles
Number-one singles in New Zealand
Oricon International Singles Chart number-one singles
RCA Records singles
RSO Records singles
Songs about fame
Fame (franchise)
Songs written for films
Songs with music by Michael Gore
Songs written by Dean Pitchford
Television drama theme songs
Ultratop 50 Singles (Flanders) number-one singles
UK Singles Chart number-one singles